One Day (RTGS: Fanday…Fan Kun Khae Wan Diaw) is a 2016 Thai romance drama film directed by Banjong Pisanthanakun, and starring Chantavit Dhanasevi and Nittha Jirayungyurn.

In October 2016, Banjong was in Singapore to promote his new romantic drama together with the two leads, Chantavit and TV actress Nittha who is making her debut on the big screen.

Synopsis 
Denchai (Chantavit Dhanasevi) is in love with his colleague Nui (Nittha Jirayungyurn) but does not have the courage to express his feelings towards her. He finally gets his chance during the company trip. He makes a wish to be with Nui for just one day, and his wish comes true.

Cast 
 Chantavit Dhanasevi as Denchai 
 Nittha Jirayungyurn as Nui

Awards and nominations

References

External links 
 

Films directed by Banjong Pisanthanakun
2016 films
Thai-language films
Thai romance films
Films shot in Japan
Films set in Hokkaido
GDH 559 films
Japan in non-Japanese culture